Mikhail Mikhaylovich Galaktionov (born 21 May 1984) is a Russian football manager. He manages FC Lokomotiv Moscow and the Russia national under-21 football team.

Managing career
He reached the semifinal of the 2015 UEFA European Under-17 Championship as the manager of the Russia U-17 squad.

He was appointed a caretaker manager of FC Akhmat Grozny in the Russian Premier League after their previous manager Oleg Kononov resigned on 30 October 2017.

On 14 December 2017 he was appointed Akhmat's permanent manager and signed a 3.5-year contract with the club.

He resigned from Akhmat on 7 April 2018 following a series of 2 draws and 4 losses in 6 games as the team dropped to 11th in the table.

On 7 December 2018, he was appointed head coach of the Russia national under-21 football team. Under his management, the team qualified for 2021 UEFA Under-21 Euro, marking the second time Russia qualified in the last 12 attempts.

On 16 June 2022, Galaktionov signed a two-year contract with Russian Premier League club FC Pari Nizhny Novgorod. As Russia was banned from international competitions at the time due to the Russian invasion of Ukraine, including the Under-21 national team, Russian Football Union permitted Galaktionov to hold both positions simultaneously. On 11 November 2022, Galaktionov resigned from his Pari NN position.

On 13 November 2022, Galaktionov signed a contract with FC Lokomotiv Moscow until the end of the 2023–24 season, with an option to extend.

References

External links
 Profile by Russian Premier League
 Profile by FootballFacts

1984 births
Sportspeople from Moscow
Living people
Russian football managers
FC Akhmat Grozny managers
FC Lokomotiv Moscow managers
Russian Premier League managers
State University of Management alumni